William Earl Fears (September 28, 1920 – August 25, 2008) was a long-serving Democratic member of the Senate of Virginia from the 1960s to the 1990s.

Early life and career
Fears was born in Jonesboro, Arkansas on September 28, 1920.  He left home at the age of 13 to live with relatives on Maryland's Eastern Shore and in New York.  In 1943, Fears earned a bachelor's degree in metallurgical engineering at Yale University. He served in the U.S. Army Air Forces during World War II.  He saw combat as a lieutenant in the 92nd Bombardment Group based in England.  After military service, Fears earned a law degree from the University of Cincinnati.  He practiced law in Pittsburgh, Pennsylvania and New York City before relocating to Accomac, Virginia on Virginia's Eastern Shore in 1950, where he practiced law for 50 years.

Political career
Fears served as Commonwealth's Attorney for Accomac County, Virginia until his election to the Virginia Senate in 1967.  He defeated incumbent Senator E. Almer Ames Jr. "a Byrd Organization stalwart" to secure the Democratic nomination and was subsequently elected to represent the 1st District.

In 1971, the Virginia General Assembly was redistricted and Senator Fears' home in Accomac County was placed in the 3rd District which included part of the Virginia Peninsula in addition to the Eastern Shore counties of Accomac and Northampton.  He was re-elected to the Senate throughout the 1970s and 1980s.  In 1991, the 3rd District was redrawn to include more Republican-leaning territory on the Virginia Peninsula.  During the legislative session that year, Fears spoke against increasing penalties for drunk driving, saying, "We're going to take all the sport out of drinking and driving."  That November, Republican Tommy Norment defeated Fears.

Death
William E. Fears died on August 25, 2008.

References

External links
 
 

1920 births
2008 deaths
Democratic Party Virginia state senators
People from Accomac, Virginia
Politicians from Jonesboro, Arkansas
Yale School of Engineering & Applied Science alumni
University of Cincinnati alumni
United States Army Air Forces personnel of World War II
20th-century American politicians
United States Army Air Forces officers